The Tachypleini is the tribe of horseshoe crabs.

Genera
There are 2 genera in the tribe Tachypleini:
 Carcinoscorpius Pocock, 1902
 Tachypleus Leach, 1819

References 

Xiphosura
Extant Miocene first appearances
Arthropod tribes